Vladimir Shcherbak may refer to:

 Vladimir Shcherbak (footballer, born 1970), Russian football manager and player
 Vladimir Shcherbak (footballer, born 1959), Russian footballer
 Vladimir Shcherbak (painter) (1947–2018), Russian-Bulgarian painter
 Vladimir Shcherbak (politician) (1939–2010), Soviet and Russian CPSU functionary and politician